In Mandaeism, the zidqa brika (or zidqa brikha) is a type of ritual meal blessed by Mandaean priests. Zidqa means oblation and can also mean alms, while brika means blessed.

The zidqa brika is offered and eaten at the end of tarmida (junior priest) initiation ceremonies, after the novice's 60-day seclusion period. It is also offered during the Parwanaya festival.

It is distinct from the lofani and dukrana, which are two other types of ritual meal offered for the dead.

Prayers
In E. S. Drower's version of the Qolasta, prayers 348-374 are for the zidqa brika. Prayers 375-381 are blessings recited after the zidqa brika.

See also
Sacred food as offering
Votive offering
Dukrana
Eucharist
Koliva
Lofani
Zidqa

References

External links
Zidqa Brikha (Blessed Oblation)

Mandaean ceremonial food and drink
Mandaic words and phrases
Funeral food and drink